St. Raphael's Edible Garden is a community garden located in St. Raphael's Estate. The former derelict site was acquired by Sufra NW London in 2016 and was granted permission to build a community garden project by the Brent Council in 2017. The garden is a private space for local residents and visitors to learn and engage in community gardening activities.

Background
The site used to be home to a council estate, which was demolished in 2013. This caused a brownfield land to be present in the St. Raphael's estate, which locals referred to as an “eyesore” which was prone to flytipping.  Local residents decided to develop the site as a community garden.

In 2015, Sufra NW London was raising money for an edible garden in the area. It used several backings from different funds, including Joanna Lumley's support with Marks and Spencers' Spark Something Good Campaign. In an exclusive interview with the express, Lumley said: "I love the St. Raphael's edible garden project. St Raphael’s community in Brent is today creating an edible garden in the middle of their estate so they can bring the residents together and encourage a healthy lifestyle for all."

In 2016, Brent Council approved a growing garden project. The garden project was located just a minute walk away from Sufra's main office and was named St. Raphael's Edible Garden. The charity officially launched the project in March 2017 and runs various accredited garden courses for children and adults. 

In November 2016, Sufra was featured on episode 1 of BBC's The Big Food Rescue. Which followed two men on a mission to change Britain's food habits by rescuing the fresh food that supermarkets used to bin and getting it to the people who need it. It highlighted the use of the community garden and how it benefits local residents.

The community garden won £1000 in funding from Aviva Community Fund in 2017, this was used for resources such as seeds to kickstart the growing of edible plants. In 2019, the garden increased the number of people Sufra helps to 3000 annually. It was fully completed and officially opened in August 2019.

In 2022, St. Raphael's Edible Garden partnered with Social Farms & Gardens and HelloFresh, becoming their London garden representative. The partnership is designed to encourage local communities to grow their own vegetables, reduce their carbon footprint and enjoy the benefits of being in nature. St. Raphael’s Edible Garden featured in their campaign starring Farming and Gardening Advocate (and former member of JLS) JB Gill to encourage more sustainable kitchen habits in UK homes

Features
St. Raphael's Edible Garden had a tipi made of wooden poles and organic cotton for guests to shield from the rain and cold. In 2022, the tipi was replaced with a yurt, funded by Arcus Infrastructure Partners LLP. The garden currently has a wildlife pond which has fish and other pond animals and, until 2022, had a chicken coop with over 20 chickens for the production of eggs sold to residents of the estate. The garden also has compost bins, a pizza oven, a greenhouse and a stunning pergola.

Although the garden is managed and run by Sufra NW London, it is maintained by staff and volunteers.

Activities
 Forest School
 Growing Club
 Little Sprouts
 Garden Market
 Herbal Healing
 Composting Club
 School Visits

See also
Sufra NW London

References

External links
 

Food banks in the United Kingdom
Charities based in London
Charities based in Brent
Botanical gardens in London
Gardens in London
Greenhouses in the United Kingdom